Survey Peak is located in the northern Teton Range in the U.S. state of Wyoming. The peak is on the border of Grand Teton National Park and the Jedediah Smith Wilderness of Caribou-Targhee National Forest. Survey Peak rises to the immediate north of Berry Creek and can be accessed via the Berry Creek Trail.

References

Mountains of Grand Teton National Park
Mountains of Wyoming
Mountains of Teton County, Wyoming